The Pioche Formation is a geologic formation in Utah and Nevada. It preserves fossils dating back to the Cambrian period.

See also

 List of fossiliferous stratigraphic units in Utah
 Paleontology in Utah
 Pioche, Nevada

References

 

Cambrian geology of Nevada
Cambrian geology of Utah
Cambrian southern paleotropical deposits
Cambrian northern paleotropical deposits